Lilly is a music album by Italian singer-songwriter Antonello Venditti, released by Rca Italian in late 1975.

All the songs are written by Antonello Venditti. It was the first album by Venditti to peak the Italian charts. The long ballad "Lo stambecco ferito", telling the story of an Italian corrupted entrepreneur who flees to Switzerland with all his money, is inspired to Felice Riva, who, after leading  the Rizzoli group to bankrupt (with the loss of 8,000 jobs), had escaped  to Lebanon to avoid the Italian justice. The title track is dedicated to a drug-addicted woman.

Track listing
"Lilly"
"L'amore non ha padroni"
"Santa Brigida"
"Attila e la stella"
"Compagno di scuola"
"Lo stambecco ferito"
"Penna a sfera"

Antonello Venditti albums
1975 albums